Ed Silvoso (born June 15, 1945) is a  New Apostolic Reformation Argentinian evangelist, author, and documentarian. He founded Harvest Evangelism and the Transform Our World Network, the objective of which is to end worldwide systemic poverty in its four expressions. He was a leader in the Argentine Revival during the 1990s and is a formative figure in the modern transformation movement. Silvoso has hosted conferences, participated in symposiums, provided leadership training, and appeared in the media. He has published six books and produced a documentary library of over forty titles.

Early ministry 
Ed Silvoso was born at San Nicolás de los Arroyos, Argentina. He is the son of Omar Edmundo Silvoso and Maria Teresa Troia and has a younger sister, Maria Rosa. He formed an evangelistic team at the age of seventeen when the country was intensely anti-evangelical. He graduated from Colegio Nacional Justo Jose de Urquiza in 1962; seven years later he became a pastor in Mar del Plata, Argentina. Silvoso married Ruth Noemi Palau, the sister of evangelist Luis Palau, on April 20, 1968, and they have four daughters.

He attended Multnomah Bible College in Portland, Oregon, and later moved to Pasadena, California, to continue his studies at Fuller Seminary. Silvoso began working with Luis Palau as part of Overseas Crusades in 1970 as coordinator for International Mass Media Evangelism (1970–1976). He was full-time with Palau's evangelistic team (1977–1980) before founding Harvest Evangelism.

Career 
Silvoso began as a lay evangelist and national youth leader in Argentina (1958–1969), before he attracted large audiences in the United States. He then established Harvest Evangelism at San Jose, California, in 1980; it is now known as Transform Our World (TOW). While this ministry pioneered city transformation, its initial influence was the result of efforts in Resistencia, Argentina. The Silvosos converted their family property at San Nicolás de los Arroyos into a chapel and retreat center to develop a prayer-based evangelical ministry (1983–1988). The story is told with detail in That None Should Perish, 1994.

The same approach was applied to more than three hundred cities, and it expanded to six continents. Silvoso began to host international conferences that promoted local, regional, and national change through ecumenical ministry. The lessons learned were shared in Silvoso's first book, That None Should Perish: How to Reach Entire Cities for Christ through Prayer Evangelism (1994). The concepts in this volume inspired the Transform Our World Network, a voluntary association that creates alliances between local marketplaces and various faith-based assemblies.

Members are challenged to invest their resources to help eradicate systemic poverty in its four aspects. This theme is broadened in Prayer Evangelism: How to Change the Spiritual Climate Over Your Home, Neighborhood and City (2000) and Anointed for Business (2002). Five paradigms are at the core of TOW, and they involve changes in spiritual climate, public policies, and ecclesiastical institutions.

Silvoso is an acknowledged leader of the Argentine Revival, and thousands in the United States have observed his methodology over the past thirty years, both clergy and laity. As a result, they have adopted his approach to transformation, a process that affects the marketplace as well as the church. He identifies “five pivotal paradigms” required for lasting transformation, the social indicator of which is the elimination of systemic poverty. This is culminated in his book, Transformation: Change the Marketplace and You Change the World (2007).

His book Ekklesia: Rediscovering God's Instrument for Global Transformation discusses the intent of the early church and introduces transition points that enable the modern church to return to the type of communities the apostles founded.

Books 
That None Should Perish: How to Reach Entire Cities for Christ Through Prayer Evangelism. Ventura, CA: Regal Press, 1994. 
Prayer Evangelism: How to Change the Spiritual Climate Over Your Home, Neighborhood and City. Ventura, CA: Regal Press, 2000. 
Women: God's Secret Weapon: God's Inspiring Message to Women of Power, Purpose and Destiny. Ventura, CA: Regal Press, 2001. 
Anointed for Business. Ventura, CA: Regal Press, 2002. 
Transformation: Change the Marketplace and You Change the World. Ventura, CA: Regal Press, 2007. 
Ekklesia: Rediscovering God's Instrument for Global Transformation. Bloomington, MN: Chosen Books, 2017.

References

External links 
Ed Silvoso's website
The Harvest Evangelism website
International Transformation Network website

1945 births
Living people
People from San Nicolás de los Arroyos
Argentine male writers
Argentine evangelicals
Multnomah University alumni